The following is a list of presidents of al-Azhar University since its nationalization in 1961. The reforms brought about by Act 103 of 1961 were the most sweeping in al-Azhar's history. They led to the loss of al-Azhar's independence and its incorporation into the Egyptian educational system as a full university.

List

References
General

Specific

Academic staff of Al-Azhar University
Al-Azhar
Al-Azhar